Jennifer Zhu Scott (朱晋郦) is an entrepreneur and investor based in Hong Kong, specialized in blockchain, Artificial Intelligence (AI) and other deep tech.

Early life and education 
Jennifer Zhu Scott is originally from the Sichuan Province in Southwestern China. She graduated with the Bachelor's degree in Applied Mathematics and Computer Science at Sichuan University, China in 1997. She later on got an MBA in Finance at Manchester Business School, where she earned a distinction with her research on PE/VC (Private Equity/Venture Capital) in China. There, she was also awarded the honour of being Distinguished Alumni.

She has participated in debates since then such as at Oxford University in 2017 where she argued against the concept of Universal Basic Income and at Princeton in 2018 about Sustainable Energy.

Career 
Jennifer Zhu Scott has a long professional experience in the fintech industry. More specifically, she is a leading expert in Artificial Intelligence, blockchain, data ownership and has a deep understanding of these topics within a Chinese context and in a global landscape. She has been the Head of Business Development and Strategy in APAC for Thomson Reuters and an independent investor and advisor for fintech start-ups. Jennifer also co-founded one of the first education companies in China and she sold it before moving to the UK to become senior advisor to the education subsidiary of Daily Mail & General Trust.

In 2015, she founded Radian Partners, an advisory company and investment community based in Hong Kong, focusing on direct investment in deep tech and renewable energy.

In terms of career achievements, Jennifer was appointed as one of the 18 council members of the China Council, convened by the Global Agenda Council, the World Economic Forum’s think tank and co-chaired by former NDRC (National Development and Reform Commission) Chair Zhang Xiaoqiang and Australia Prime Minister Kevin Rudd. In 2016, Jennifer was re-appointed by the World Economic Forum to be one of the 20 members of the inaugural Council of The Future of Blockchain. She had previously been honoured in 2013 by the WEF as a Young Global Leader. Jennifer Zhu Scott was listed at the Forbes World’s Top 50 Women in Tech in 2018. She is an Associate Fellow of The Royal Institute of International Affairs (also known as Chatham House) and a China Fellow of Aspen Institute and a permanent of the Aspen Global Leadership Network.

Jennifer has also been a frequent speaker on Artificial Intelligence, FinTech, China macroeconomics and Sustainable Investment on different events and conferences. One of the highlights of her career is speaking at Davos 2018 when she debated against Nobel Prize winner Prof. Robert Shiller and Swedish Central Bank Deputy Governor Cecilia Skingsley on Crypto Assets, which was broadcast on television on Yi Cai in China. She also plays an important role as an opinion writer. She is, in fact, a lead author and co-author of several White Papers by the World Economic Forum on topics such as business technology adoptions, blockchain and the Token Economy. In addition, she is a tech columnist for Caixin Global.

One of her last projects has been her role as a consultant to the HBO show Silicon Valley for its fifth and sixth season.

Personal life 
Jennifer is said to have lived through extreme poverty when she was a child in Sichuan. And she has become now a powerful innovator who influences global leaders and advice some of the most powerful financial technology corporations.

Jennifer currently lives in Hong Kong with her husband and their two daughters.

References 

Living people
Year of birth missing (living people)